The 1979 Austrian motorcycle Grand Prix was the second round of the 1979 Grand Prix motorcycle racing season. It took place on 29 April 1979 at the Salzburgring circuit.

500 cc classification

References

Austrian motorcycle Grand Prix
Austrian
Motorcycle Grand Prix